Ward Tower is a prominent mountain, located 3 nautical miles (6 km) east-northeast of Mount Aldrich on the main ridge of Britannia Range. Named by Advisory Committee on Antarctic Names (US-ACAN) after Commander Edward M. Ward, U.S. Navy, commanding officer of U.S. Navy Squadron VX-6 during Operation Deep Freeze I and II, 1955–56 and 1956–57.

Mountains of Oates Land
Britannia Range (Antarctica)